David Sergio Sandoval Plaza (born 20 October 1952) is a Chilean politician who currently serves as a member of the Senate of his country.

References

External links
 BCN Profile

1952 births

Living people
Chilean people
20th-century Chilean politicians
21st-century Chilean politicians
University of Chile alumni
Independent Democratic Union politicians
National Renewal (Chile) politicians